The National Union of Shop and Distributive Employees (NUSDE) is a trade union representing workers in the retail and distributive industries in Nigeria.

The union was founded in 1978, when the Government of Nigeria merged the following unions:

 P. Z. African Workers' Union of Nigeria
 U. A. C. and Associated Companies African Workers' Union of Nigeria
 Nigerian Union of Industrial and Mercantile Workers
 C.F.A.O. and Associated Companies African Workers' Union of Nigeria
 National Cash Register Company Workers' Union
 Nigerian Mercantile Technical, Clerical and General Workers' Union
 Konsumas General Workers' Union Atlas
 Nigeria Workers' Union
 Lennards (Lagos) Ltd. African Workers' Union of Nigeria
 J. T. Chanrai and Company (Nigeria) Limited Workers' Union
 Nigerian Mercantile Companies and Allied Union
 Holts African Workers' Union of Nigeria
 G. B. Ollivant and Associated Company African Workers' Union
 K. Chellarams African Workers' Union of Nigeria
 Nigerian Stores Workers' Union
 National Union of Textile, Garment and Tailoring Workers
 Western Nigeria Co-operative Exporters Workers' Union
 Singer Industries and Associated Co. Workers' Union
 Nassar and Sons (Nigeria) Limited Workers' Union
 Nigergas Limited Workers' Union
 J. L. Morrison Sons and Jones (Nigeria) Limited Employees' Union
 Holman Brothers (Nigeria) Limited Workers' Union
 Cneico (Nigeria) Limited Workers' Union
Wayne (West Africa) Limited Workers' Union
 Nigerian Commercial and Industrial Enterprises Limited African Workers' Union of Nigeria
 Chanrai African Workers' Union
 Dizengof (West Africa) Nigeria Workers' Union
 Union of Pharmaceutical Salesman and Allied Workers of Nigeria
 Stormline D. C. Payne and Associates Workers' Union
 W. F, Clarke and Associated Companies Workers' Union of Nigeria
 Blackwood, Hodge (Nigeria) Ltd. African Workers' Association
 Brian Munro Ltd. and Allied Industries Workers' Union
 Bhojsons Industries Workers' Union
 Kaycee (Nigeria) Limited Workers' Union
 Hamzer and Allied Company Workers' Union of Nigeria
 Witt and Bush Group of Companies Workers' Union of Nigeria
 NAAFCO Workers' Union
 Tradev Workers' Union of Nigeria
 G. B. Holding Ltd. and Associated Cos. African Workers' Union
 158 Baresel Ltd. African Workers' Union of Nigeria
 U. T. C. African Workers' Union of Nigeria
 S. C. O. A. Workers' Union of Nigeria
 V. Y. B. and Associated Companies African Employees' Union
 Kaycee Nigeria Ltd. African Workers' Union
 Ibru Group of Companies Workers' Union
 Bulkoil Plant of Nigeria Workers' Union
 Major and Company and Associated Companies Workers' Union
 Datrade Polfa and Associated Company Workers' Union

The union was a founding affiliate of the Nigeria Labour Congress (NLC).  By 1995, it had about 20,000 members.  In 2016, the union left the NLC to become a founding constituent of the United Labour Congress (ULC).  However, in 2020, the whole ULC rejoined the NLC.

References

Retail trade unions
Trade unions established in 1978
Trade unions in Nigeria